Ivan Selesnick is an electrical engineer from the NYU Polytechnic School of Engineering in Brooklyn, New York. He was named a Fellow of the Institute of Electrical and Electronics Engineers (IEEE) in 2016 for his contributions to wavelet and sparsity based signal processing.

Education
BS, MEE, and PhD degrees in Electrical Engineering in 1990, 1991, and 1996 from Rice University, Houston, Texas.

References 

Fellow Members of the IEEE
Living people
Rice University alumni
New York University faculty
Year of birth missing (living people)
American electrical engineers